Allamah Sheikh Ahmed bin Muhammad bin Fahad al-Hilli al-Asadi (1355–1438), famously known as Ibn Fahad al-Hilli, was an eminent Iraqi Shia jurist and religious authority.

He was known for his works on religious ethics, supplications and spirituality.

Early life and education
The whereabouts of his birthplace are unknown. He lived for a while in Hillah, which was one of the first center of Shi'a scholars such as ibn Fahd. He studied at the Zaynabiyah school, and was taught by the students of Fakhr al-Muhaqiqeen and al-Shaheed al-Awwal.

Agha Bozorg al-Tehrani believes that he was among the students of al-Shaheed al-Awwal. Al-Hilli received his ijaza in 1421, from the son of al-Shaheed al-Awwal when he visited Jabal Amel, and Jezzine. After that, he moved to Karbala, and found its religious seminary. His move played an important role in establishing Karbala, as the religious Shia kernel at the time.

Impact on the Qara Qoyunlu state 
In 1436, Ispend bin Yusuf, the ruler of Baghdad, invited al-Hilli, so that he may debate his faith with Sunni scholars. In the debate, al-Hilli and his consortium of Shia scholars, debated with the Sunnis and were able to beat them, and convince Ispend to convert to Shi'ism. Through his move, Ispend declared Shi'a Islam as the official religion of his state and struck coins with the names of the twelve Imams.

Works
He wrote books on different aspects of Islamic sciences such as mysticism, jurisprudence, tradition and other religious spheres. Some of them include:
 Al Awiyah va Al Fatum
 Istekhraj Al Havadeth (predicting some events, such as appearance of Safavid dynasty and Mongol's Attack by Ali ibn Abi Talib
 The Mysteries of Praying
 Tahsin fi Sefat al Arefin
 Iddat Al Daei

Death and shrine
He died in Karbala, and was buried in his home. Over time, a shrine was erected over his tomb. The ground floor of his home became a mosque, and an inn for the pilgrims of Karbala. The upper levels became a religious seminary, known as the Ibin Fahad school. In 1939, a library was built in the shrine, and was named the Rasool al-Adham library. In the 1964, Sayyid Muhammad al-Shirazi and his brother, Sayyid Hassan al-Shirazi strived to renovate the seminary, and managed to do so by gathering donations from some of the notables of Karbala, and this was all done under the supervision of the supreme religious authority of the time, Sayyid Muhsin al-Hakim.

His shrine lies on the Qibla street, approximately 500 metres from the Imam Husayn shrine. After the US invasion of Iraq, the Shiite Endowment Office appointed Aref Nasrallah as the commissioner of the shrine and seminary.

See also
 Ja'fari jurisprudence
 Principles of Islamic jurisprudence

References 

Date of birth missing
Date of death missing
Muslim mystics
Writers of the medieval Islamic world
Islamic culture
Muslim scholars of Islamic jurisprudence
14th-century births
15th-century deaths
14th-century Muslim scholars of Islam
15th-century Muslim scholars of Islam